The , officially  is Japan's professional football league including the first division J1 League, second division J2 League and third division J3 League of the Japanese association football league system. J1 League is one of the most successful leagues in Asian club football.

History

Before the professional league (pre-1992)

Before the inception of the J.League, the highest level of club football was the Japan Soccer League (JSL), which consisted of amateur clubs. Despite being well-attended during the boom of the late 1960s and early 1970s (when Japan's national team won the bronze Olympic medal at the 1968 games in Mexico), the JSL went into decline in the 1980s, in general line with the deteriorating situation worldwide. Fans were few, the grounds were not of the highest quality, and the Japanese national team was not on a par with the Asian powerhouses. To raise the level of play domestically, to attempt to garner more fans, and to strengthen the national team, the Japan Football Association (JFA) decided to form a professional league. During this era, Japanese football investors traveled exclusively to Europe to find a possible model; eventually, the Japanese embraced the model of Germany's Bundesliga to develop its own professional league.

The professional association football league, J.League was formed in 1992, with eight clubs drawn from the JSL First Division, one from the Second Division, and the newly formed Shimizu S-Pulse. At the same time, JSL changed its name and became the Japan Football League, a semi-professional league. Although the J.League did not officially launch until 1993, the Yamazaki Nabisco Cup competition was held between the ten clubs in 1992 to prepare for the inaugural season.

Inaugural season and J.League boom (1993–1995)
J.League officially kicked off its first season with ten clubs on 15 May 1993, when Verdy Kawasaki hosted Yokohama Marinos at the Tokyo National Stadium.

After the boom (1996–1999)
Despite the success in the first three years, in early 1996 the league attendance declined rapidly, coincided with the economic slump of Japan. In 1997, the average attendance was 10,131, compared to more than 19,000 in 1994. Yokohama Flügels were merged with Yokohama Marinos due to the withdrawal of one of their major sponsors, right after they became the winners of the 1998 Emperor's Cup on 1 January 1999.

Change of infrastructure and game formats (1999–2004)

The league's management realized that they were heading in the wrong direction. In order to solve the problem, the management came out with two solutions.

First, they announced the J.League Hundred Year Vision, in which they aim to make 100 professional association football clubs in the nation of Japan by 2092, which would be the hundredth season. The league also encouraged the clubs to promote football or non-football related sports and health activities, to acquire local sponsorships, and to build good relationships with their hometowns at the grass-root level. The league believed that this would allow the clubs to bond with their respective cities and towns and get support from local government, companies, and citizens. In other words, clubs would be able to rely on the locals, rather than major national sponsors.

Second, the infrastructure of the league was heavily changed in 1999. The league acquired nine clubs from the semi-professional JFL and one club from J. League to create a two-division system. The top flight became the J.League Division 1 (J1) with 16 clubs while J.League Division 2 (J2) was launched with ten clubs in 1999. The second-tier Japan Football League (former), now became third-tier Japan Football League.

Also, until 2004 (with the exception of 1996 season), the J1 season was divided into two. At the end of each full season, the champion from each half played a two-legged series to determine the overall season winner and runners-up. Júbilo Iwata in 2002, and Yokohama F. Marinos in 2003, won both "halves" of the respective seasons, thus eliminating the need for the playoff series. This was the part of the reason the league abolished the split-season system starting from 2005.

European League Format & AFC Champions League (2005–2008)
Since the 2005 season, J.League Division 1 consisted of 18 clubs (from 16 in 2004) and the season format became similar to the European club football. The number of relegated clubs also increased from 2 to 2.5, with the third-from-bottom club going into Promotion / relegation Series with the third-placed J2 club. Since then, other than minor adjustments, the top flight has stayed consistent.

Japanese teams did not treat the Asian Champions League that seriously in the early years, in part due to the distances travelled and teams played. However, in the 2008 Champions League, three Japanese sides made the quarter-finals.

However, in the recent years, with the inclusion of the A-League in Eastern Asia, the introduction of FIFA Club World Cup, and increased marketability in the Asian continent, both the league and the clubs paid more attention to Asian competition. For example, Kawasaki Frontale built up a notable fan base in Hong Kong, owing to their participation in the AFC Champions League during the 2007 season. Continuous effort led to the success of Urawa Red Diamonds in 2007 and Gamba Osaka in 2008. Thanks to excellent league management and competitiveness in Asian competition, the AFC awarded J.League the highest league ranking and a total of four slots starting from the 2009 season. The league took this as an opportunity to sell TV broadcasting rights to foreign countries, especially in Asia.

Also starting the 2008 season, Emperor's Cup Winner was allowed to participate in the upcoming Champions League season, rather than waiting a whole year (i.e. 2005 Emperor's Cup winner, Tokyo Verdy, participated in the 2007 ACL season, instead of the 2006 season). In order to fix this one-year lag issue, the 2007 Emperor's Cup winner, Kashima Antlers' turn was waived. Nonetheless, Kashima Antlers ended up participating in the 2009 ACL season by winning the J.League title in the 2008 season.

Modern phase (2009–2014)
Three major changes were seen starting in the 2009 season. First, starting that season, four clubs entered the AFC Champions League. Secondly, the number of relegation slots increased to three. Finally, the AFC Player slot was implemented starting this season. Each club will be allowed to have a total of four foreign players; however, one slot is reserved for a player that derives from an AFC country other than Japan. Also, as a requirement of being a member of the Asian Football Confederation, the J.League Club License regulations started in 2012 as one criterion of whether a club was allowed to stay in its division or to be promoted to a higher tier in the professional level league. No major changes happened to J.League Division 1 as the number of clubs stayed at 18.

Now (2015–present)
From 2015 the J.League system changed to a three-stage system. The year is split into first and second league stages, followed by a third and final championship stage. The third stage is composed of stage one and two's total point champions and up to four other teams. These additional four teams consist of the following: Stage one and stage two's top point accumulator, and stage one and two's second placed points accumulator. These five teams then take part in a championship playoff stage to decide the winner of the league trophy.

In 2017, the single-table format returned due to a negative reaction from hardcore fans and a failure to appeal to casual fans.

In January 2023, Promotion and Relegation between J3 to JFL to be introduced start from 2023 season.

Timeline

Stance in the Japanese football pyramid 

Since the inception of the second division in 1999, promotion and relegation follow a pattern similar to the European leagues, where the two bottom clubs of J1 and the top two clubs of J2 are guaranteed to move. From the 2004 to 2008 season, the third-placed J2 club entered the Promotion / relegation Series against the sixteenth-placed J1 club and the winner had a right to play in the top flight in the following year. Starting on the 2009 season, the top three J2 clubs receives J1 promotion by default in place of three bottom J1 clubs. However, promotion or right to play the now-defunct pro/rel series relies on the J2 clubs meeting the requirements for J1 franchise status set by the league. This has generally not been a hindrance, in fact, no club is yet to be denied promotion due to not meeting the J1 criteria.

Until the 2004 season, the J1 season was divided into two halves, with an annual championship series involving the champions from each half (with the exception of the 1996 season). However, from the 2005 season, the single-season format is adopted as the top flight was expanded to eighteen clubs. Currently, 18 clubs compete in double round robin, home and away. Starting on the 2008 season, the top three clubs, along with the Emperor's Cup winner receive ACL berths for the following season. If the Emperor's Cup winner happens to be one of the top three J1 finishers, the 4th-place club receives the final berth. Starting on the 2009 season, the bottom three clubs are relegated to Division 2 at the end of the year. The two-halves format returned in 2015 but was abandoned again after 2016.

Starting in 2012, Division 2 established promotion playoffs for the clubs ranked 3rd to 6th, in a manner similar to the EFL Championship in England, the Serie B in Italy and the Segunda División in Spain. However, the semifinals would be only one leg and all matches that ended in draws would enable the higher ranked club in the table to advance or be promoted.

In 2013 the J3 League was established and while its champion was promoted automatically, the runner-up had to play a promotion/relegation series until 2017. From 2018 to 2023 two clubs was promoted automatically. From 2024 onwards, Division 3 established promotion playoffs for the clubs ranked 3rd to 6th respectively and winner playoff entered third team promotion.

From 2023 onwards, J. League introduce promotion and relegation between J3 and JFL.

The three divisions of the J. League will consist of 20 teams from 2024 season.

Crest

Clubs

Membership requirements 
The requirements for joining the J.League include items such as the stadium, management status, and team management status.  Regarding team management, not only the team itself that actually participates in the J League game, but also the management obligation of the club youth team by the training organization (subordinate organization) are stipulated.  From the 2013 season, the J-League club license system was launched, and the system for judging whether or not to join the J-League and the division that can join was updated.

In addition, since 2006, it has been decided to certify clubs that meet the criteria for joining the J. League After 2014, it will be called J. League 100 Year Plan club status instead.

List of member clubs 
Club categories and listing order based on club composition for 2023 season. As for the home stadium, the stadium shown on the J League corporate site as of 2022 is described. Regarding the descriptions in multiple materials, based on the description of the club guide on the J League official website, the stadium name was based on the naming rights (see the article of each stadium for the handling of naming rights)

Clubs with J3 licenses 
Clubs that have not joined the J.League but have been granted a J3 license for the 2023 season (including the J.League 100-year concept club).

J.League 100 Year Plan Club 
The home stadium is at the time of approval of the 100-year plan club and at the time of J3 admission examination in 2020 Based on the official J-League release.

Former Clubs that were regular members of the J.League

Clubs that were former J.League associate members, associate members and Centennial Clubs

Champions

Promotion and Relegation

Changes in the number of clubs  promotion and relegation system 

J1 Entry playoffs have been introduced from 2018, 2019 and 2022 respectively. Relegation from J1 to J2 introduced from 1999, J2 to J3 introduced from 2013 and J3 to JFL introduced from 2023. J1 Promotion playoff introduce from 2012 to 2017, reintroduced in 2023 onwards and J2 Promotion playoff to be introduce start from 2024.

In 1998, the J1 entry decision match was held. From 1999, a replacement system was introduced with the transition to a two-part system of J1 and J2. Since 2012, a replacement system has been introduced between J2 and the lower league (Japan Football League (JFL) in 2012, J3 after the 2013 postseason).

 Until the introduction of the J.League club license system in 2012, if a J2 club that obtained the right to be promoted to J1 through the examination by the J.League did not meet J1 standards, the promotion to J1 would be revoked, and the relegation to J2 from the 16th place in J1 would also be revoked. could have been used, but there have been no cases in which it has actually been applied.

 If a club that has received a loan from the official match stable holding fund cannot repay it by the repayment date, the club belonging to J1 will be demoted to J2 even if it is in the order to remain in J1, and the club belonging to J2 will be promoted to J1. However, the promotion will be postponed. It is unknown whether promotion will be postponed even if it is a rank that can be promoted to J2 in the clubs belonging to J3. However, at the end of the 2021 season, the only cases in which this system could have been applied in the past were Oita in 2013.

 After the 2012 postseason (entry in 2013), in order to enter the J1, J2 and J3 leagues, it is necessary to obtain a license for that league or higher under the club license system.

 If the number of matches that have been completed does not reach 75% of the total number of matches scheduled for the year in the J1/J2/J3 league, or if the number of matches in the category to which one belongs falls short of 50% of the total number of matches scheduled for that year. If there is a club that does not exist, the tournament will be disqualified and no promotion or relegation will take place.

 Those with "†" are promotions and promotions based on the result of the shunting match. Remaining in the shunting and entry playoffs is not reflected.

 The number of J3 teams includes the number of 2014 and 2015 J.League Under 22 teams and the number of U-23 teams from 2016 to 2020.

About the future 
The J.League has announced a policy of setting a maximum of 20 teams for the J3 League and 60 teams for the total number of regular member teams including J1 and J2. According to interviews with people involved in the J.League, it has become clear that J1, J2, and J3 are proposing to have 20 teams each from 2024 at the earliest.

In conjunction with the increase in the number of teams, this is a new growth strategy that revises the ratio of equal distribution money, and in particular, the policy of grading allocation centered on the top clubs of J1. It is said that the aim is to improve the value of the J.League by increasing the provision of high-quality matches. If there are 20 teams in each class, in 2023, only the lowest (18th) club will be demoted from J1 to J2, and conversely, 3 clubs will be promoted from J2 to J1. It is said that there is.

After that, on 20 December 2022, based on the J League's two new growth strategies ("60 clubs shine in their respective regions" and "top tier shines as national (global) content"), From the 2024 season, J1, J2, and J3 will have 20 teams each, and J. League cup games will officially be renewed to a knockout (tournament) format in which all 60 clubs from J1, J2, and J3 will participate. was announced in.

Branding 
The first official J.League Anthem - "J'S THEME" debuted in 1993 and was composed by Michiya Haruhata. It was used during league broadcasts and as a prelude to kickoff at stadiums.

J.League and J.League clubs make the most out of their logos / emblems and mascots for branding and marketing.

Awards

Manager of the Year Award
Most Valuable Player Award
Top Scorer Award
Rookie of the Year Award
Best XI Award

See also

Japan Football Association

League system
Japanese association football league system
Domestic league(s)
J.League
J1 League
J2 League
J3 League
Japan Football League
Regional Champions League
Regional Leagues

Domestic cup(s)
Fujifilm Super Cup
Emperor's Cup (National Cup)
J.League YBC Levain Cup (League Cup)

Notes

References

External links 

 Official website 

 
Sports leagues in Japan
Professional sports leagues in Japan